Padukka Divisional Secretariat is a  Divisional Secretariat  of Colombo District, of Western Province, Sri Lanka.

References
 Divisional Secretariats Portal

Divisional Secretariats of Colombo District